Athletics competitions at the 1951 Bolivarian Games
were held at the Estadio Olímpico de la Universidad Central de Venezuela in Caracas,
Venezuela, between 5-21 December 1951.  

A detailed history of the early editions of the Bolivarian Games between 1938
and 1989 was published in a book written (in Spanish) by José Gamarra
Zorrilla, former president of the Bolivian Olympic Committee, and first
president (1976-1982) of ODESUR.  Gold medal winners from Ecuador were published by the Comité Olímpico Ecuatoriano.

A total of 28 events were contested, 21 by men and 7 by women.

Medal summary

Medal winners were published.

Men

Women

Medal table (unofficial)

References

Athletics at the Bolivarian Games
International athletics competitions hosted by Venezuela
Bolivarian Games
1951 in Venezuelan sport